Kevin Young (born 12 August 1961) is an English former footballer who played for Burnley, Torquay United, Port Vale, Bury, Utrecht, and Murton. He won promotion out of the Third Division with Burnley in 1981–82 and out of the Fourth Division with Bury in 1984–85.

Career
Young began his career as an apprentice at Burnley, turning professional under Harry Potts in May 1979 after making his league debut in the 1978–79 season. He made 27 appearances in the 1979–80 season, as the "Clarets" were relegated out of the Second Division under the stewardship of Brian Miller. During the 1980–81 campaign, he scored his first goal in the Football League on 16 September, in a 2–0 win over Hull City at Turf Moor, and also claimed goals in victories over Oxford United and Chester. He scored seven goals in 49 appearances in the 1981–82 season, as Burnley won promotion as Third Division champions. He scored two goals in 38 games in the 1982–83 season, as caretaker-manager Frank Casper failed to steer the club away from relegation. He featured just twice in the 1983–84 season, and it became apparent that he had no future at the club under new boss John Bond. In November 1983, he moved to Torquay United on loan, and scored one goal in three Fourth Division games for Bruce Rioch's "Gulls"; his spell at Plainmoor was brief. In December 1983, he moved on loan to Port Vale until the end of the season, becoming John Rudge's first signing as "Valiants" manager. Adding balance to the midfield, he scored four goals in 28 Third Division games. After returning to Burnley from Vale Park, he made a permanent transfer to Lancashire rivals Bury.

He helped Martin Dobson's "Shakers" to win promotion out of the Fourth Division in 1984–85. They then finished one place and three points above the Third Division relegation zone in 1985–86, before rising into mid-table in 1986–87. He scored ten goals in 88 league games during his time at Gigg Lane. He then spent three years in the Netherlands with Han Berger's Utrecht, helping the Eredivisie club to finish tenth in 1987–88, 13th in 1988–89, and 14th in 1989–90. He later returned to England to play non-league football for Murton.

Career statistics
Source:

Honours
Burnley
Football League Third Division: 1981–82

Bury
Football League Fourth Division fourth-place promotion: 1984–85

References

Footballers from Sunderland
English footballers
Association football midfielders
Burnley F.C. players
Torquay United F.C. players
Port Vale F.C. players
Bury F.C. players
English expatriate footballers
Expatriate footballers in the Netherlands
FC Utrecht players
Murton A.F.C. players
English Football League players
Eredivisie players
1961 births
Living people
English expatriate sportspeople in the Netherlands